Robert Murić (born 12 March 1996) is a Croatian professional footballer who plays for Turkish club Konyaspor, as a right winger.

Club career
Murić played youth football in Croatia for Lepoglava, Schiedel Novi Golubovec, Ivančica Ivanec, Zagorec Krapina and Dinamo Zagreb.

In January 2014 he was linked with a transfer to English club Manchester United.

In June 2014 he signed a four-year contract with Dutch club Ajax, effective from 1 July 2014. Dinamo Zagreb claimed that the contract between Murić and Ajax was not valid, and that he remained their player. In July 2014 Murić was awarded squad number 18 by Ajax for the forthcoming season. He played for Jong Ajax in the Eerste Divisie for the 2014–15 and 2015–16 seasons.

He spent the 2016–17 season on loan at Italian club Pescara.

In August 2017 he signed a five-year contract with Portuguese club Braga.

In February 2019 he returned to Croatia and signed a two-and-a-half year contract with HNK Rijeka.

In June 2022 he signed for Turkish club Konyaspor.

International career
Murić has played for the Croatia under-17 team, for whom he played at the 2013 FIFA U-17 World Cup, as well as the 2013 UEFA European Under-17 Football Championship. He also played for the under-19 team. On 25 March 2019, Murić made his debut with Croatia U21 in the match against Italy U21. He took part with the U21 team in the 2019 UEFA European Under-21 Championship.

Career statistics
.

Honours
Dinamo Zagreb
1. HNL: 2013–14

Rijeka
 Croatian Cup: 2019, 2020

References

External links
 

1996 births
Living people
Sportspeople from Varaždin
Association football wingers
Croatian footballers
Croatia youth international footballers
Croatia under-21 international footballers
AFC Ajax players
Jong Ajax players
Delfino Pescara 1936 players
S.C. Braga players
HNK Rijeka players
Konyaspor footballers
Eerste Divisie players
Eredivisie players
Serie A players
Liga Portugal 2 players
Croatian Football League players
Süper Lig players
Croatian expatriate footballers
Croatian expatriate sportspeople in the Netherlands
Expatriate footballers in the Netherlands
Croatian expatriate sportspeople in Italy
Expatriate footballers in Italy
Croatian expatriate sportspeople in Portugal
Expatriate footballers in Portugal
Croatian expatriate sportspeople in Turkey
Expatriate footballers in Turkey